"Last Night Lonely" is a song recorded by American country music singer Jon Pardi. It is his thirteenth single release overall, and the first from his fourth studio album Mr. Saturday Night.

Content
The song was written by Dylan Marlowe, Joe Fox, and Jimi Bell. The three of them wrote the song in 2020. Marlowe provided the song's riff, at which point they came up with the title. From this they developed a "grocery list" of events in the lives of a couple who are drinking alcohol together and describe their impending romance as their "last night lonely". Fox thought the final product had a similar sound to a Tom Petty or Bruce Springsteen song. The final recording, co-produced by Bart Butler and Ryan Gore, features a fiddle solo from Jenee Fleenor. Also present are guitarist Rob McNelley, drummer Miles McPherson, and bass guitarist Lee Francis.

Billy Dukes of Taste of Country described the song as an "uptempo" song with "raw guitar chords", comparing it favorably to Pardi's "What I Can't Put Down".

Music video
A music video directed by Harper Smith was released on May 6, 2022. Pardi checks into a roadside motel just outside Las Vegas, where he changes into a black suit and is escorted into downtown via limousine.

Charts

Weekly charts

Year-end charts

References

2022 singles
2022 songs
Jon Pardi songs
Capitol Records Nashville singles